The 44th Filmfare Awards South ceremony honouring the winners and nominees of the best of South Indian cinema films released 1996, is an event that was held in Hyderabad 30 August 1997. The awards were distributed at Ravindra Bharati Auditorium, Hyderabad.

Main awards

Kannada cinema

Malayalam cinema

Tamil cinema

Telugu cinema

Special awards

Awards presentation

References

 Filmfare Magazine October 1997

External links
 
 

Filmfare Awards South